The Kambalakonda Wildlife Sanctuary is a forest located near Visakhapatnam.  It has been under the control of Andhra Pradesh Forest Department since 10 March 1970.  Earlier the land was under the control of Maharajah of Vizianagaram.  It was named after the local hillock Kambalakonda.  It is a dry evergreen forest mixed with scrub and meadows and covers an area of 70.70 square kilometers. The indicator species is the Indian leopard.

Geography
The sanctuary is located from latitudes of 17.34° N to 17.47° N and longitudes of 83.04° E to 83.20° E. The location corresponds to an area west of National Highway 16 on the northern side of Visakhapatnam and Pendurthi in Visakhapatnam district.  It can be reached by road about 3 km from Visakhapatnam, opposite to zoo park.

The sanctuary has a  dry evergreen forest mixed with scrub and meadows. The terrain is hilly with steep slopes.

Flora and fauna

Flora
There is diverse flora and fauna in this sanctuary representing the Eastern Ghats. Floral diversity is high and includes:

Fauna
There is a varied fauna present in the sanctuary.

Mammals

Reptiles

Birds

Butterflies

Gallery

See also 
 Andhra Pradesh Forest Department
 Dolphin Nature Conservation Society

References

External links 

Wildlife sanctuaries in Andhra Pradesh
Tourist attractions in Visakhapatnam
Parks in Visakhapatnam
Uttarandhra
1970 establishments in Andhra Pradesh
Protected areas established in 1970